Indian Creek Township is a township in Mills County, Iowa, USA.

History
Indian Creek Township was organized in 1853; it was then known as Montgomery Township. This township was renamed Indian Creek in 1857.

References

Townships in Mills County, Iowa
Townships in Iowa
1853 establishments in Iowa
Populated places established in 1853